The 7th National Assembly of Laos was elected by a popular vote on 30 April 2011 and was replaced by the 8th National Assembly on 20 April 2016.

Meetings

Presidency

Members

References

Citations

Bibliography
Books:

7th National Assembly of Laos
2011 establishments in Laos
2016 disestablishments in Laos